Uprising in Bosnia and Herzegovina may refer to:

 Uprising in Bosnia and Herzegovina (1831-1832), uprising of Muslim nobility in Bosnia and Herzegovina, against the Ottoman central government
 Uprising in Bosnia and Herzegovina (1875-1878), uprising of Serbs in Bosnia and Herzegovina against the Ottoman Empire
 Uprising in Bosnia and Herzegovina (1941), uprising against occupation of Nazi Germany and Fascist Italy

See also
 Herzegovina Uprising (disambiguation)
 Serbian Uprising (disambiguation)